Luis Carlos Manrique (born 8 September 1955) is a Colombian former cyclist. He competed in the individual road race and team time trial events at the 1976 Summer Olympics.

References

External links
 

1955 births
Living people
Colombian male cyclists
Olympic cyclists of Colombia
Cyclists at the 1976 Summer Olympics
Sportspeople from Santander Department